Melvin Elijah Sykes (January 10, 1901 – March, 1984) was an American Negro league outfielder in 1926.

A native of Decatur, Alabama, Sykes was the brother of fellow Negro leaguer Doc Sykes. Younger brother Melvin attended Morehouse College, where he was captain of the baseball and basketball teams, and graduated in 1926. His Negro league career was limited to a single season, 1926, when he split time between the Hilldale Club and the Lincoln Giants.

After his brief professional baseball career, Sykes worked in real estate in New York, but eventually returned to Decatur, where he became involved in various organizations including the Alabama Democratic Conference. Sykes died in Decatur in 1984 at age 83.

References

External links
 and Seamheads

1901 births
1984 deaths
Hilldale Club players
Lincoln Giants players
Baseball outfielders
20th-century African-American sportspeople
Baseball players from Alabama
Sportspeople from Decatur, Alabama